Spearwood may refer to:

Spearwood, Western Australia, a suburb
Spearwood, common name of several plant species:
Acacia doratoxylon
Eucalyptus doratoxylon
Kunzea ericifolia
Kunzea glabrescens
Pandorea doratoxylon